World War II postal acronyms were first used to convey messages between servicemen and their sweethearts back home. They were usually written on the back of an envelope.

The acronyms, possibly including some more recent additions, include:

 S.W.A.L.K. — Sealed With A Loving Kiss. A variant is S.W.A.K. ("Sealed With A Kiss"). 
 V.E.N.I.C.E. — Very Excited Now I Caress Everywhere
 E.G.Y.P.T. — Eager to Grab/Eagerly Groping/Grasping Your Pretty Tits
 B.U.R.M.A. — Be Undressed/Upstairs Ready My Angel
 R.A.D.I.O. Romance And Delight I Offer (often used with B.U.R.M.A.)
 S.I.A.M. Sexual Intercourse At Midnight (used with B.U.R.M.A. as in B.U.R.M.A. 4 S.I.A.M.) 
 H.O.L.L.A.N.D. — Hope Our Love Lives/Lasts And Never Dies
 I.T.A.L.Y. — I Trust And Love You or I'm Thinking About Loving You
 F.R.A.N.C.E. — Friendship Remains And Never Can End
 M.A.L.A.Y.A. — My Ardent Lips Await Your Arrival
 B.E.L.F.A.S.T. - Be Ever Loving, Faithful And Stay True. 
 N.O.R.W.I.C.H - (K)Nickers Off Ready When I Come Home

Terry Pratchett parodied this briefly in his Discworld novel Going Postal. His acronyms included L.A.N.C.R.E. and K.L.A.T.C.H. (Lancre and Klatch being two locations in the Discworld), although these were never officially expanded.

A Dirty Pretty Things song is named "B.U.R.M.A." after the postal acronym and contains the line 'Be Upstairs Ready My Angel'.

References

Romance
Acronyms